Arianna Valcepina (born 9 May 1994) is an Italian short track speed skater. She won a silver medal at the 2022 Winter Olympics in the mixed team relay.

References

Living people
1994 births
Olympic short track speed skaters of Italy
Short track speed skaters at the 2022 Winter Olympics
Italian female short track speed skaters
People from Sondalo
Olympic silver medalists for Italy
Medalists at the 2022 Winter Olympics
Olympic medalists in short track speed skating
Sportspeople from the Province of Sondrio